Seminars in Perinatology is a bimonthly peer-reviewed medical journal covering perinatology. It was established in 1977 and is published by Elsevier. The editors-in-chief are Ian Gross (Yale School of Medicine) and Mary E. D'alton (Columbia University Medical Center). According to the Journal Citation Reports, the journal has a 2014 impact factor of 2.682.

References

External links

Elsevier academic journals
Bimonthly journals
Publications established in 1977
Pediatrics journals
Obstetrics and gynaecology journals
English-language journals